Jozef Kukučka (born 13 March 1957) is a retired Czechoslovakian football player.

During his club career he played for TJ Plastika Nitra, TJ Rudá Hvězda Cheb, FC Bohemians Praha and ZVL Považská Bystrica. He earned 7 caps for the Czechoslovakia national football team from 1981 to 1985, and participated in the 1982 FIFA World Cup.

References

External links

1957 births
Living people
Slovak footballers
Czechoslovak footballers
Czechoslovakia international footballers
1982 FIFA World Cup players
FK Hvězda Cheb players
Bohemians 1905 players
FC Nitra players
Association football defenders
MŠK Považská Bystrica (football) players
Sportspeople from Považská Bystrica